Shredder is a 2003 American slasher film directed by Greg Huson. It stars Scott Weinger and Lindsey McKeon and centers on a group of friends being stalked and murdered by an unknown assailant at an abandoned ski resort. It was filmed in North Idaho at Silver Mountain Ski Resort, and released direct-to-video in the United States by MGM Home Entertainment.

Plot
A man named Chad (Elliot Olson) is snowboarding down a mountain, when suddenly a skier dressed in black attacks him. He attempts to get away, but is decapitated by a piece of wire strung up between two trees.

Meanwhile, college student Kimberly (Lindsey McKeon) is going on a trip to an abandoned ski resort, which her father will be buying soon, with her boyfriend Cole (Scott Weinger), cousin Pike (Juleah Weikel), and friends Skyler (Billy O'Sullivan), Robyn (Holly Towne) and Kirk (Peter Riggs). While stopping at a gas station, the group bump into the European Christophe (Brad Hawkins), who they quickly invite along with them.

After arriving at the resort, Cole and Skyler go back into town to retrieve beer. They are warned away from the resort by a bartender, Bud (Ron Varela). Skyler also briefly meets Bud's daughter Shelly (Candace Moon) to whom he takes a liking. Arriving back at the resort, the group partake in drinking games until the town Sheriff (Seth Reston) shows up. Kimberly and Robyn manage to bribe him to let them stay there for the night. However, as the Sheriff leaves the cabin he is stabbed to death by the skier. Kimberly then tells the others that a few years ago, a group of snowboarders murdered a young girl at the resort, and that's why it had closed down.

The next day, the group go snowboarding. Kirk stumbles upon a small building hidden in the mountain. As he enters to investigate, he is stabbed with an icicle by the skier. Meanwhile, Skyler bumps into Shelly while she ski's. The two make out and decide to stick together but Bud appears and sends Shelly home, warning Skyler to leave the resort. As Robyn uses the chairlift, the killer boards with her and attempts to throw her off. Robyn fights back and manages to push him off the chairlift instead. But, as she prepares to deboard her scarf wraps around the handle and she is hanged as the lift drags her off the ground and dies.

At the cabin, Skyler meets up with Cole and Pike, before the trio stumble upon the Sheriff's body. The group quickly suspects Christophe as the murderer and set out to warn the others. While searching, they find the little girl preserved in ice and Skyler is stabbed in the leg with an axe by the skier. They manage to subdue the killer and escape. In a hot tub, Kimberly discovers Christophe was at the resort when the little girl was murdered, and that all the other witnesses had been murdered also. It is revealed the little girl was Bud's daughter as Christophe suspects him for the previous killings, as revenge for the death of his youngest daughter. Kimberly and Christophe then begin to have sex. Cole soon sees the pair and angrily leaves, prompting Kimberly to follow him. After they leave, Christophe is beaten to death with a shovel.

Returning to the cabin, the survivors find the car disabled and the dead bodies of their friends lined up in the snow. In the cabin, the group tend to Skyler's leg. Cole and Pike go outside to fix the car, leaving Kimberly and Skyler in the cabin. The skier sneaks inside and murders Skyler, stabbing him through the eye with a ski pole. Kimberly hides from the killer in a cupboard, where she finds Chad's body. The killer manages to break in the cupboard and stabs Kimberly with a poker. Cole rushes inside, but finds Kimberly dead before the skier locks him in the cabin.

Outside, Pike fixes the car as the skier swiftly attacks her. In a panic, she crashes the car before the skier hits her in the head. Cole manages to get outside and finds Pike's body. Cole travels up the mountain, taunting the killer. He is soon shot at by a figure, revealed to be Bud. Bud tells Cole he simply wanted to scare the group away from the area, but Cole tries to escape. Bud chases him on a snowmobile, and is quickly decapitated by a piece of wire strung up between two trees. Cole then makes his way into town. After entering an alley, he becomes trapped as the skier drives a large shredding truck to block his path. The killer is revealed to be Shelly, who wants revenge for the death of her younger sister. As she is about to murder Cole, Pike shows herself to be alive and shoots Shelly. Shelly then falls into the shredder, sending a fountain of blood into the air. Cole and Pike leave the town and presumably start a relationship.

Cast
Scott Weinger as Cole
Lindsey McKeon as Kimberly
Juleah Weikel as Pike
Billy O'Sullivan as Skyler
Holly Towne as Robyn
Brad Hawkins as Christophe
Peter Riggs as Kirk
Candace Moon as Shelly
Ron Varela as Bud
Seth Reston as Sheriff
Elliot Olson as Chad

Production
Shredder was filmed on location at the Silver Mountain Ski Resort in Kellogg, Idaho.

Release and reception
The film was released Direct-to-DVD on December 16, 2003 in the United States, however it had a limited theatrical release in the Pacific Northwest. In Japan, the film was released under the name Jason Z.

On Rotten Tomatoes the film has received one 'fresh' review and one 'rotten' review from critics.

Notes

References

External links

2003 films
2003 horror films
Direct-to-video horror films
American slasher films
2000s slasher films
Films shot in Idaho
Metro-Goldwyn-Mayer direct-to-video films
2000s English-language films
2000s American films